There's No Way may refer to

 "There's No Way" (Alabama song), 1985
 "There's No Way" (Lauv song), featuring Julia Michaels, 2018

See also
 
 
 No Way (disambiguation)